The Fujinon XF 27mm F2.8 is an interchangeable camera pancake lens announced by Fujifilm on June 25, 2013. At 27 mm, it has a 35 mm equivalent focal length of 41 mm, making it a normal lens of maximum aperture 2.8. The intended benefit of this lens is its extreme compact size, extending only  from the flange, and light weight, only , with the trade off of having no aperture ring.

Notes

References
http://www.dpreview.com/products/fujifilm/lenses/fujifilm_xf_27mm/specifications

Camera lenses introduced in 2013
27
Pancake lenses